Fotballklubben Donn is a Norwegian football club from the neighbourhood Lund in Kristiansand, most notable for its women's football team. It was founded on 24 June 1909 and named after a dog.

Donn Toppfotball
The women's football team Donn Toppfotball played in Toppserien, the highest tier of women's football in Norway, for two periods. The first spell was between 1993 and 1995, and the club also reached the final of the Norwegian Women's Cup in 1994 where they were beaten by Trondheims-Ørn. Charmaine Hooper, the most capped Canadian player, played for Donn during this heyday for the club. The women's team also played in Toppserien in 2010.

The women's team won promotion in the 2009 season, and they reconstituted themselves as a professional outfit called Donn Toppfotball. After finishing 9th in 2010 Toppserien, Donn Toppfotball was bankrupted.

Recent women's seasons
{|class="wikitable"
|-bgcolor="#efefef"
! Season
! 
! Pos.
! Pl.
! W
! D
! L
! GS
! GA
! P
!Cup
!Notes
|-
|2007
|1D
|align=right |7
|align=right|18||align=right|7||align=right|2||align=right|9
|align=right|23||align=right|32||align=right|23
|2nd round
|
|-
|2008
|1D
|align=right |5
|align=right|18||align=right|7||align=right|4||align=right|7
|align=right|24||align=right|34||align=right|25
|3rd round
|
|-
|2009
|1D
|align=right bgcolor=silver|2
|align=right|22||align=right|12||align=right|5||align=right|5
|align=right|52||align=right|21||align=right|41
|3rd round
|Promoted to Toppserien
|-
|2010
|TS
|align=right |9
|align=right|22||align=right|6||align=right|2||align=right|14
|align=right|25||align=right|45||align=right|20
|3rd round
|
|}

Men's team
The men's football team played in the top tier from 1937 to 1948 but, at that time, the league was organized differently with several groups. In the recent years, the men's team have played in the Third Division (fourth tier) since 1994, except a short visit in the Second Division in 2004, and one year in the Fourth Division in 2011.

Recent men's seasons
{|class="wikitable"
|-bgcolor="#efefef"
! Season
!
! Pos.
! Pl.
! W
! D
! L
! GS
! GA
! P
!Cup
!Notes
|-
|2018
|3. divisjon
|align=right |5
|align=right|26||align=right|12||align=right|5||align=right|9
|align=right|63||align=right|48||align=right|41
|First qualifying round
|
|-
|2019
|3. divisjon
|align=right| 11
|align=right|26||align=right|9||align=right|4||align=right|13
|align=right|40||align=right|60||align=right|31
|First round
|
|}

References

External links
Official site
Official site (women)
 Kongsgårdbanen - Nordic Stadiums

Football clubs in Norway
Association football clubs established in 1909
Sport in Kristiansand
1909 establishments in Norway